P.A.M. Transportation Services Inc. is an irregular route over-the-road trucking company that is based in Tontitown, Arkansas. Founded in April 1980, P.A.M's current service area covers the lower continental 48 states as well as the southern parts of Ontario, Canada. In the early 1990s, P.A.M. began providing transportation services to Mexico under agreements with several Mexican trucking carriers.
P.A.M. Transport serves clients primarily in the automotive, manufacturing, and retail industries and its primary freight consists of general commodities, automotive parts, and heating and air conditioning units. According to the Hoovers financial data on this company, P.A.M.’s company name stands for Pretty Awesome Mileage, yet according to the company's own FAQ on their website, P.A.M. is short for the company founder's initials, Paul Allen Maestri.

Company Awards 
P.A.M. Transport was one of the first companies to connect the trucking and business communities. In 2002 and 2003, P.A.M. Transport was named to Forbes magazine's 200 Best Small Companies in America, coming in at number 90 in 2002 and number 186 in 2003.

P.A.M.’s Trucking Fleet 

P.A.M. Transport operates a fleet of over 2,000 trucks and 6,000+ trailers. Most of P.A.M.’s trucks are Peterbilt, Freightliner and International tractors that have an average age of 18 months. P.A.M. tractors also include various standard industry equipment, including air-ride cabs, Qualcomm satellite equipment, routing and directional software, and in-cab email service, and installed electronic logs on all units.

P.A.M. Transport hauls dry-van trailers, and its fleet consists of  trailers.

Company-Sponsored Training 
P.A.M. Transport adopted a way to develop properly trained, safety conscious truck drivers through a sponsorship training program. Since 1992, P.A.M. Transport has offered a company-sponsored CDL training program for entry-level drivers through a partnership with the Driver Solutions Network. Through this program, P.A.M. Transport sponsors its students' upfront training costs to attend a partner truck driving school and provides an entry level driving position to drivers once they successfully complete the CDL training. To date, P.A.M. has introduced over 14,000 new drivers to the trucking industry.

References

External links 
Corporate Website

Trucking companies of the United States
Companies based in Arkansas
Washington County, Arkansas
Companies listed on the Nasdaq
Transport companies established in 1980
1980 establishments in Arkansas
Transportation companies based in Arkansas
American companies established in 1980